Malakhov is a rural locality (a khutor) in Proninskoye Rural Settlement, Serafimovichsky District, Volgograd Oblast, Russia. The population was 57 as of 2010. There are 4 streets.

Geography 
Malakhov is located 83 km southwest of Serafimovich (the district's administrative centre) by road. Khokhlachev is the nearest rural locality.

References 

Rural localities in Serafimovichsky District